Phillip Davey,  (10 October 1896 – 21 December 1953) was an Australian recipient of the Victoria Cross (VC), the highest award for gallantry in battle that could be awarded to a member of the Australian armed forces at the time. Davey enlisted in the Australian Imperial Force in December 1914 for service in World War I, and joined his unit, the 10th Battalion, on the island of Lemnos on 10 April 1915. Along with his battalion, he landed at Anzac Cove, Gallipoli, on 25 April. He fought at Anzac until he was evacuated sick in early November, returning to Australia the following January.

Davey embarked for England in June 1916, and rejoined his battalion on the Western Front in October. In January 1918 he was awarded the Military Medal for bravery in rescuing a wounded man under fire. He was promoted to corporal in April. In the lead-up to the capture of Merris in June, he killed an eight-man German machine-gun crew, saving his platoon from annihilation, for which he was awarded the VC. During this action he was severely wounded. He returned to Australia to be discharged, and was employed by South Australian Railways over many years before dying in 1953, having suffered for years with bronchitis and emphysema. He was buried with full military honours in the AIF Cemetery, West Terrace. His medals are displayed in the Hall of Valour at the Australian War Memorial.

Early life
Phillip Davey was born on 10 October 1896 at Unley, South Australia, to William George Davey, a carpenter, and his wife Elizabeth,  O'Neill; he was one of five sons of the couple who would see service in World War I. Phillip attended Flinders Street Model School and Goodwood Public School. After his schooling, he was involved in well boring and opal mining in Central Australia; at the outbreak of World War I he was a horse driver.

World War I
On 22 December 1914, aged 18, Davey enlisted as a private in the Australian Imperial Force (AIF) and was posted to the 2nd reinforcements to the 10th Battalion. He sailed for Egypt from Melbourne on 2 February 1915. The 3rd Brigade had been chosen as the covering force for the landing at Anzac Cove, Gallipoli, on 25 April. The brigade embarked on the battleship  and the destroyer , and after transferring to strings of rowing-boats initially towed by steam pinnaces, the battalion began rowing ashore at about 4:30am.

Davey participated in the heavy fighting at the landing and subsequent trench warfare defending the beachhead. After several bouts of illness, he was evacuated to Egypt with enteric fever in early November. In January 1916 he was repatriated to Australia to recover his health. He re-embarked at Melbourne in June, arrived in the United Kingdom in August, and embarked for France the following month. While he had been recuperating, the infantry formations of the AIF had been withdrawn from Gallipoli to Egypt, then transferred to the Western Front in France and Belgium. Davey rejoined the 10th Battalion in early October.

From the time Davey returned, the 10th Battalion rotated through front-line, reserve, training and fatigue duties, mainly in the Somme river sector. In February 1917, it participated in an operation at Le Barque, southwest of Bapaume. On 15 March, Davey was accidentally wounded by a hand grenade while the battalion was in camp, but returned to duty less than a month later, during the Battle of Arras. He was promoted to lance corporal in early May, at which time the battalion was fighting in a support role at Bullecourt. In September, the battalion was committed to the Passchendale offensive, specifically at the Battle of Menin Road at Polygon Wood. The following month Davey was gassed while the 10th Battalion was relieving troops in the front-line near Westhoek Ridge; he returned to his unit in early November.

Through the winter of 1917/1918, the battalion rotated through various duties, in and out of the front-line. On 3 January 1918, Davey rescued a wounded soldier under heavy fire, and was awarded the Military Medal (MM) for bravery in the field. The recommendation read: 

Davey was promoted to corporal on 24 April 1918, and that night the 10th Battalion conducted an operation near Méteren. The following month he was detached to Tidworth in England as an instructor, but returned to his unit at his own request on 23 June. Five days later, he was with his battalion during a "peaceful penetration" operation near Merris. Over the previous 18 months, the 10th Battalion had developed raising and patrolling skills that were critical in this type of more open warfare. The 10th's commanding officer, Lieutenant Colonel Maurice Wilder-Neligan, initially ordered a platoon to secure a position around a hedge. As this was successful, and another platoon achieved similar success, he then committed two companies to the operation, covered by a smoke screen and trench mortar fire. One platoon reached the hedge, and began to dig in, when a nearby machine gun opened fire, killing the platoon commander, causing other casualties and scattering the platoon. Davey then went forward alone twice, and using hand grenades, killed the crew and captured the machine gun. He then turned it on a German counter-attack, which was repelled.

Davey's actions in single-handedly eliminating a German machine gun post resulted in the award of the Victoria Cross (VC), the highest award for gallantry in battle that could be awarded to a member of the Australian armed forces at the time. He was initially recommended for the Distinguished Conduct Medal, but when the recommendation reached the commander of XV Corps, Lieutenant General Henry de Beauvoir De Lisle, he upgraded it to a recommendation for the VC and noted, "[a] most gallant and self-sacrificing action". The citation read: 

Davey's platoon was soon relieved by a reserve platoon that re-established the post. The 10th Battalion operation had seized  of the German front line, along with thirty-five prisoners, six machine guns and two Minenwerfer trench mortars, for the loss of fifty casualties. Davey had sustained wounds to his back, abdomen and legs, and was evacuated to England. After he had recovered sufficiently he received his VC at Buckingham Palace on 12 September. On this occasion, Wilder-Neligan wrote a note to Davey which said: 

Davey then embarked to return to Australia in October, and was discharged from the AIF on 24 February 1919. A fellow VC recipient, Arthur Blackburn later said, "I think all agree that no VC was ever better earned than Phil Davey's". Four of Davey's brothers had also enlisted, Claude, Richard, Joseph and Arthur, with Joseph being aged 16 when he joined up. Joseph was wounded at Pozières and was promoted to lance corporal before his real age was discovered and he was sent home. Phillip's brothers Claude and Richard were also awarded the MM during World War I, Claude being killed in action in 1917.

Later life

After returning from the war, Davey worked for South Australian Railways as a labourer and linesman over three periods between 1926 and 1946: 27 April 1926 to 4 October 1938; 6 March 1939 to 12 February 1942; and 17 December 1943 to 22 February 1946. He married Eugene Agnes Tomlinson on 25 August 1928; they had no children. After suffering for many years with bronchitis and emphysema, Davey died on 21 December 1953 of a coronary occlusion. He was buried at the West Terrace AIF Cemetery, Adelaide, with full military honours.

As well as the VC, MM, 1914–15 Star, British War Medal and Victory Medal for his service in World War I, Davey was later awarded the King George VI Coronation Medal and Queen Elizabeth II Coronation Medal. His medal set, including his VC, was presented to the Australian War Memorial in Canberra in 1967, and is displayed in the Hall of Valour.

Footnotes

References
 
 
 
 
 
 
 
 
 
 
 
 
 
 
 
 

1896 births
1953 deaths
Military personnel from South Australia
Australian Army soldiers
Australian recipients of the Military Medal
Australian World War I recipients of the Victoria Cross
Burials at West Terrace Cemetery
People from Adelaide